Gerald Keith Phiri Jr. is a Malawian professional footballer who plays as a midfielder for Sudan Premier League club Al-Hilal Club and the Malawi national team. He is the son of Malawian football manager Gerald Phiri Sr.

He signed for South African clubs Bidvest Wits F.C. in 2015 from Zimbabwean teams CAPS United.

He was named in the Malawi national team for the 2015 COSAFA Cup in South Africa, making his debut against Mozambique national team at the quarter-final stage.

International goals 
Scores and results list Malawi's goal tally first.

References

External links

1993 births
Living people
People from Blantyre
Malawian footballers
Association football midfielders
Malawi international footballers
Mighty Wanderers FC players
CAPS United players
Bidvest Wits F.C. players
Township Rollers F.C. players
Platinum Stars F.C. players
Cape Town Spurs F.C. players
Baroka F.C. players
Al-Hilal Club (Omdurman) players
2021 Africa Cup of Nations players
Malawian expatriate footballers
Expatriate footballers in Zimbabwe
Expatriate footballers in Botswana
Expatriate soccer players in South Africa
Expatriate footballers in Sudan
Malawian expatriate sportspeople in Zimbabwe

Malawian expatriate sportspeople in South Africa